Daniel Stålhammar (born October 10, 1974) is a Swedish former football referee. Stålhammar currently resides in Landskrona.  He was a full international referee for FIFA between 2004 and 2013. He became a professional referee in 1995 and an Allsvenskan referee in 2002. Stålhammar refereed 190 matches in Allsvenskan, 73 matches in Superettan and 73 international matches. He retired on September 10th, 2013 due to health problems.

See also
List of football referees

References

External links
FIFA
SvFF

1974 births
Living people
Swedish football referees